Mog is a fictional character in a series of children's books written by Judith Kerr. Other regularly occurring characters include Mr and Mrs Thomas (Mog's owners) and their two children Nicky and Debbie. In each book Mog gets into a different conundrum with a new character or event. Unusually for a popular children's series, Mog dies in the final book, 2002's Goodbye, Mog.

Kerr based her illustrations of the house in which the family live on her own family home in Barnes, London, and the two children were named after the middle names of her own son and daughter, Matthew and Tacy. The family name "Thomas" is from the first name of her husband, Nigel Kneale, upon whom the appearance of Mr Thomas was based.

In November 2015, the character was featured in the Christmas advert for supermarket Sainsbury's. In Mog's Christmas Calamity Mog accidentally starts a fire in her home after having a bad dream, but is able to alert the fire brigade (as she had called 999 when scrabbling across a phone); she is hailed a hero for saving her owners, and (after her owners' neighbours pool their resources to undo the damage she had done, in reference to Sainsbury's "Christmas is for sharing" tagline) is later given an egg as a treat. Kerr herself appears in this advert as a neighbour of the Thomas family. A special plush Mog and book version of the story were sold exclusively through Sainsbury's, with all profits being donated to Save the Children's child literacy work.

In 2020, 50 years since the publication of the first book, a new book was released titled Mog's Birthday in which a birthday party is thrown for Mog, to the cat's annoyance, but she comes to enjoy the celebration.

"Mog" is a short form of moggy, a word for a cat that is not a specific breed.

Publications 
Titles include (with year of first publication):

Mog the Forgetful Cat (1970)
Mog's Christmas (1976)
Mog and the Baby (1980)  
Mog in the Dark (1983)
Mog and Me (1984)
Mog's Family of Cats (1985)
Mog's Amazing Birthday Caper (1986)
Mog and Bunny (1988)
Mog and Barnaby (also known as Look Out, Mog, 1991)
Mog on Fox Night (1993)
Mog in the Garden (1994)
Mog's Kittens (1994)
Mog and the Granny (1995)
Mog and the Vee Ee Tee (1996)
Mog's Bad Thing (2000)
Goodbye, Mog (2002)
Mog's Christmas Calamity (2015)
My First Mog Books (Mog’s Family, Mog’s Day, Mog Loves, Mog Plays) (2016)
My First Mog 123 (2018)
Mog's Birthday (2020)

References

Characters in children's literature
Series of children's books
Books about cats
Books by Judith Kerr
Literary characters introduced in 1970